Charles Percy Abbott (born 10 June 1939) is a former Australian rules footballer who played with Hawthorn in the Victorian Football League (VFL), a polo player, and the recipient of the Australian Sports Medal.

Education 
Educated at Caulfield Grammar School (Dux of school, 1956)  – where he was a member of the school's athletic team, First IV (tennis), First XI (cricket), as well as its First XVIII (football) – and at the University of Melbourne where he gained a LL.B. in 1962.

Football 
In 1958, he played for Caulfield Grammarians Football Club in C-Section of the Victorian Amateur Football Association (VAFA). In 1959, he played for Trinity College in the University of Melbourne's Inter-College Championship and was selected as the best and fairest player for that year's competition.

Playing at centre, he was best on the ground in the University Blues' 1960 upset VAFA A-Section Grand Final win over Old Melburnians Football Club, 9.10 (64) to 6.6 (42).

Recruited from University Blues, and granted a permit in March 1961, he played just 17 games in three years at Hawthorn. He played his last match, at centre, for Hawthorn in its 1963 semi-final loss to Geelong. He was replaced by Ron Nalder in both the Preliminary Final against Melbourne, and the Grand Final against Geelong. He retired from football just before the 1964 season in order to concentrate on his legal studies.

Polo 
A talented polo player with the Hexham Club (as was Carlton's John Goold), Abbott was awarded the Australian Sports Medal on 24 October 2000 for services to polo as both a player and an administrator. He served as President of the Victorian Polo Association from 1983 to 1992; and, in 1992, was made a life member.

Law 
Holding a Legal Practising Certificate, he is a member of the Law Institute of Victoria, and a Fellow of the Australian Institute of Company Directors.

Abbot has also held chairmanships and directorships of publicly listed property companies and trusts, private equity and corporate services companies and publicly listed international insurance companies, including Norwich Union Group for 21 years (Deputy Chairman), Norwich Winterthur Insurance Limited and Norwich Union Life Assurance Limited; and he has also carried out pro bono work involving fund raising and management, serving variously as Chairman of the Trinity College Foundation (University of Melbourne), as member of the Finance committee of the Murdoch Institute, and as a Director of the Hawthorn Football Club Foundation.

See also
 List of Caulfield Grammar School people

Footnotes

References 
 Hobbs, Greg, "Amateur Rover to Try for Magpies", The Age, (Friday, 18 February 1964), p.20.
 Holmesby, Russell & Main, Jim (2007). The Encyclopedia of AFL Footballers. 7th ed. Melbourne: Bas Publishing.
 Norris, Geoffrey, Victoria's Polo: 1874 to 2014 (Gruyere), 2014.
 Tuohy, W., "Masters of a princely pursuit", The Age, (Friday, 15 March 1985), p.26.

External links
 AFL Player Statistics: Charles Abbott
 Charles Abbott, far right, Victorian Polo Association Tournament, Werribee Park, 1990.
 Charles Abbott, with bottle of champagne, at Victorian Polo Association Tournament, Werribee Park, 1990.
 University of Melbourne: Charles Abbott Scholarship (tenable at Trinity College), awarded to an outstanding student in any discipline who will make a valuable contribution to the College through sport.

1939 births
People educated at Caulfield Grammar School
People educated at Trinity College (University of Melbourne)
Melbourne Law School alumni
Australian rules footballers from Victoria (Australia)
Caulfield Grammarians Football Club players
Hawthorn Football Club players
University Blues Football Club players
Recipients of the Australian Sports Medal
Australian polo players
Living people
Fellows of the Australian Institute of Company Directors